Kacheganovo (Kösögän) is a rural locality (a selo) and the administrative centre of Kacheganovsky Selsoviet, Miyakinsky District, Bashkortostan, Russia. The population was 558 as of 2010. There are 12 streets.

Geography 
Kacheganovo is located 21 km south of Kirgiz-Miyaki (the district's administrative centre) by road. Umanka is the nearest rural locality.

References 

Rural localities in Miyakinsky District